Red Storm Entertainment, Inc. is an American video game developer and studio of Ubisoft based in Cary, North Carolina. Founded in November 1996 between author Tom Clancy, manager Doug Littlejohns, and software development company Virtus Corporation, Red Storm develops games in the Tom Clancy's franchise. Ubisoft (then known as Ubi Soft) acquired the studio in August 2000.

History 
Prior to founding Red Storm Entertainment, Tom Clancy, an American novelist, had developed Tom Clancy's SSN, a video game based on his book SSN. The game was created over six years in cooperation with Virtus Corporation, a 3D animation tool development company based in Cary, North Carolina, and its game development division, Virtus Studios. Tom Clancy's SSN was released on November 12, 1996, and on the following day, Clancy and Virtus Corporation announced the formation of Red Storm Entertainment. The name was derived from that of Clancy's book Red Storm Rising. The new company absorbed Virtus Studios, making for an initial staff count of nineteen. Red Storm moved into offices within Cary, with Clancy assuming the role of chairman, while Doug Littlejohns (a retired commodore in the Royal Navy who had previously acted as a technical consultant on Tom Clancy's SSN) became Red Storm's president and chief executive officer. The company expanded from nineteen to thirty-two people by March 1, 1997, in the wake of which it moved to new offices on Aerial Center (close to the Raleigh–Durham International Airport) in Morrisville.

The company released its first game – Tom Clancy's Politika, the first in the Power Plays series – in 1997. Red Storm quickly gained a reputation with games like Dominant Species, one of the first 3D real-time strategy games. However, it was with Rainbow Six (1998) that the company firmly established itself commercially. In contrast to the run-and-gun first-person shooters (FPS) that had gone before, Rainbow Six was the first true tactical FPS, a game that rewarded patience and planning as well as good aim and a keen eye. Developed alongside the novel of the same name, Rainbow Six introduced terms like "one shot, one kill" and "tango down" into the gamer lexicon. Its ground-breaking multiplayer action, including a new form of cooperative gameplay, set the standard for tactical multiplayer.

Red Storm followed on the success of Rainbow Six with a mission pack, Eagle Watch, and then in 2000 with a sequel, Rainbow Six: Rogue Spear. The company also expanded into turn-based strategy (ruthless.com and Shadow Watch) and military real-time strategy game (Force 21). In August 2000, Ubisoft purchased the studio. At the time of the sale, Red Storm was already producing Ghost Recon.

Released in 2001, Ghost Recon won multiple "Game of the Year" awards. The Xbox version also marked the first time Red Storm Entertainment ventured into in-house console development and was the first Xbox Live title to take advantage of the possibilities of console multiplayer. Follow-up add-ons like Island Thunder continued to expand the world of the Ghosts, while Red Storm itself grew and moved offices to a new location in Morrisville, North Carolina. By 2003, Ubisoft was ready to consolidate its North Carolina operations. Ubisoft's other area studio, Sinister Games in downtown Raleigh, was integrated into Red Storm, with the central base of operations remaining at the Morrisville location.

In 2004, Red Storm released Ghost Recon 2, the follow-up to the original game, designed by now lead designer Christian Allen. Released on Xbox, it signaled the company's transition to primarily console development. It produced an add-on, Summit Strike, in 2005, as well as downloadable content. Red Storm has also developed the multiplayer aspects of both iterations of the Ghost Recon Advanced Warfighter series. It won the BAFTA's Game of the Year and Best Technical Achievement awards in 2006.

In December 2008, Red Storm acquired the lease for the CentreGreen One building in Cary, which had previously been occupied by Qualcomm until earlier that year. Red Storm subsequently moved to CentreGreen One in May 2009, relocating from its previous offices on Gateway Centre in Morrisville.

Red Storm continued development on Tom Clancy games such as Ghost Recon: Future Soldier (2012) and The Division (2016), while co-operating with Ubisoft Montreal on the Far Cry franchise.

In 2016, Red Storm released their first virtual reality game, Werewolves Within, followed by a May 2017 release of another, Star Trek: Bridge Crew.

In May 2018, Red Storm acquired the Weston Office Campus (located on Weston Parkway in Cary), which it planned to move to after renovations and co-occupy with Ubisoft's NCSA Customer Relationship Center.

Games developed

References

External links 
 

1996 establishments in North Carolina
Companies based in North Carolina
Ubisoft divisions and subsidiaries
Video game companies established in 1996
Video game companies of the United States
Video game development companies
American subsidiaries of foreign companies
Tom Clancy